Frédéric Bougeant (born 6 December 1975) is a French handball coach of the Senegalese national team and participated at the 2019 World Women's Handball Championship in Japan.

References

Living people
1975 births
French handball coaches
French expatriate sportspeople in Russia
Handball coaches of international teams
Sportspeople from Le Havre